Vellore Institute of Technology (VIT) is a private research deemed university located in Katpadi in Vellore, Tamil Nadu, India. Founded in 1984 as Vellore Engineering College by G. Viswanathan.

The institution offers 66 Undergraduate, 58 Postgraduate, 15 Integrated, 2 Research and 2 M.Tech Industrial Programmes. It has campuses in Vellore and Chennai and sister universities in Amaravati and Bhopal.

The Government of India has recognized VIT as one of the Institutions of Eminence (IoE).

Academics and Research
VIT consolidated its disciplines into 20 Schools of Study with the addition of the VIT Law School at its Chennai campus.

VIT implements the Fully Flexible Credit System (FFCS) which gives the students to choose and make their own time tables by choosing the subjects and the faculties for the next semester.

48 Professors of VIT are among the top 2% scientists of the world as shown in a survey conducted by Stanford University, USA in 2022.

Admission
VIT admits bachelor students through its own engineering entrance exam, called the VIT Engineering Entrance Examination (VITEEE). It is conducted every year except 2020 due to COVID-19. The exam has been conducted online since 2013.

Rankings 

Internationally, VIT was ranked 1001–1200 in the QS World University Rankings of 2023 and 173 in Asia. It was ranked 801–1000 in the world by the Times Higher Education World University Rankings of 2023, 251–300 in Asia in 2022 and 301–350 among emerging economies. It was ranked 601–700 in the Academic Ranking of World Universities of 2022.

In India, the National Institutional Ranking Framework (NIRF) ranked VIT 12 overall in India in 2022, 9 among universities and 12 among Engineering institutes. 

VIT was ranked first among private engineering colleges in India by Outlook India in 2022. India Today ranked it 20 among engineering colleges in 2020.

The VIT Business School was ranked 55 among management schools in India by NIRF in 2020.

Accreditation 
VIT has been accredited with the following:

 A++ grade by NAAC (National Accreditation and Assessment Council), it has completed 4 cycles of accreditation and is going for the 5th cycle.

 It is preparing for the third round of accreditation by the NBA (National Board of Accreditation).
 It is accredited by the International accrediting agencies ABET (Accreditation Board for Engineering and Technology).
 ACBSP (Accreditation Council for Business Schools and Programs) has accredited the VIT Business School.
 ACCA (Association of Chartered Certified Accountants) has accredited the BBA program.

Culture and Fests

Riviera 
Riviera, a cultural and sports festival, has been taking place on the VIT Vellore campus since its first edition in 2002. The festival is mainly organised by the institute's students and features various activities such as sports, literary events, gaming competitions, music and dance contests, cultural parades, and professional shows, all of which draw significant attention.

Controversies 
In October 2013, two female students were suspended after they helped to organize an online opinion survey of female VIT students, focusing on issues of safety and inequality. Commenting on the issue, VIT vice president Sekar Viswanathan said: "The students started a campaign based on the misplaced notion that the university discriminates against women, which is false. They were taken home by their parents".

Notable alumni 
Papias Malimba Musafiri, Rwandan Minister of Education
Bindu Madhavi
Dhyan Sreenivasan
Shubhangi Swaroop, first female pilot in Indian Navy
Indhuja Ravichandran, a Model and Actress
Kaveri Priyam

References

External links 

 
 VITEEE

 
Engineering colleges in Tamil Nadu
Deemed universities in Tamil Nadu
Universities and colleges in Vellore district
Education in Vellore
Educational institutions established in 1984
1984 establishments in Tamil Nadu
Academic institutions formerly affiliated with the University of Madras